Silas Laurence Loomis (1822–1896) was an American scientist, educator, and inventor.

Biography
Loomis was born in Coventry, Connecticut on May 22, 1822. He graduated from Wesleyan University in 1844 and earned a degree in medicine from Georgetown University in 1856.  Previous to his study at Wesleyan, Loomis had taught at Holliston Academy, in Massachusetts;  after graduating from college, he was principal of Western Academy in Washington, D.C., and subsequently became professor of physiology at Georgetown.  He was astronomer to the United States Coast Survey in 1857, and instructor in mathematics to naval cadets in 1860.  From 1861 to 1867, he was professor of chemistry and toxicology at Georgetown, subsequently serving as dean at Howard University until 1869.

From 1862 to 1863, he was a surgeon on General George B. McClellan's staff. Later, Loomis invented a process for producing a textile fabric from palmetto, a method for utilizing ores of chromium, and various improvements in instruments of precision, among other inventions. 

He died in Fernandina Beach, Florida on June 22, 1896.

Selected works 
Normal Arithmetic (1859)
Analytical Arithmetic (1860)
Key to the Normal Course (1867)
The Education and Health of Woman (1882)

References

Wesleyan University alumni
Georgetown University School of Medicine alumni
19th-century American physicians
19th-century American inventors
American educators
American science writers
1822 births
1896 deaths
Georgetown University faculty